Marvel Comics editor-in-chief Stan Lee was known for bestowing humorous nicknames on himself, as well as Marvel's other creators, members of the "Bullpen," and various staff members (i.e.., "Marveldom Assembled"). Later editors-in-chief like Roy Thomas and Archie Goodwin continued the tradition, until Jim Shooter discontinued the practice in the 1980s. It was re-established by Mark Gruenwald when he started editing "Bullpen Bulletins" in the late 1980s. The convention was inspired, at least in part, by a Hollywood tradition, where character actors in particular were given colorful nicknames to aid in their name recognition.

Monikers like Stan "The Man" Lee and Jack "King" Kirby permeated into mass culture. This is a list of those nicknames.

See also 

 Bullpen Bulletins
 Hypocoristic
 List of Marvel Comics people
 Lists of nicknames – nickname list articles on Wikipedia
 Moniker
 Nickname
 Stage name
 Term of endearment

References

External links 
 Cornell, Paul. "Assign a Stan Lee Nickname," Paul Cornell's House of Awkwardness (March 22, 2009)

Nicknames
Lists of comics creators
Informal personal names
Marvel
Lists of nicknames